Bossiaea spinescens is a species of flowering plant in the family Fabaceae and is endemic to the south-west of Western Australia. It is a slender, spreading or compact, spiny shrub with oblong to oval leaves and yellow and reddish-brown, pea-like flowers.

Description

Taxonomy and naming
Bossiaea spinescens was first formally described in 1844 by Carl Meissner in Lehmann's Plantae Preissianae from specimens collected near York in 1839. The specific epithet (spinescens) means "somewhat spiny".

Distribution and habitat
This bossiaea grows in heathland and woodland, often amongst granite boulders in the Avon Wheatbelt, Coolgardie, Geraldton Sandplains, Jarrah Forest, Murchison and Swan Coastal Plain biogeographic regions of south-western Western Australia.

Conservation status
Bossiaea spinescens is classified as "not threatened" by the Western Australian Government Department of Biodiversity, Conservation and Attractions.

References

spinescens
Mirbelioids
Flora of Western Australia
Plants described in 1844
Taxa named by Carl Meissner